Azman Ibrahim (born 1 September 1960) is a Malaysian businessman, programmer and former manager of Kelantan FA. He became one of the most successful Kelantan's manager when the team clinched their treble in Malaysian football during 2012 season.

Education 
 Sekolah Menengah Sultan Ismail, Kota Bharu (1975)
 Bukit Bintang Boys School, Kuala Lumpur (1978)
 Indiana State University, United States (1985)
 University of Dallas, United States (1986)

References 

1960 births
Living people
People from Kelantan
Malaysian people of Malay descent
Malaysian Muslims
Kelantan FA